Charles Negron II (born June 8, 1942) is an American singer-songwriter. He is best known as one of the three lead vocalists in the rock band Three Dog Night, which he helped form in 1968.

Early life 
Chuck Negron was born on June 8, 1942, in Manhattan, New York City, to Charles Negron, a Puerto Rican nightclub singer, and Elizabeth Rooke. When Negron was five years old, his parents divorced. Negron and his twin sister, Nancy, were raised by their mother, who placed them in a daycare facility while she supported her young children. Though Negron refers to this facility as an orphanage, it was a mansion in the Bronx that contained a swimming pool, gymnasium, arts and crafts and more. The facility did house some long-term residents, though this did not include Negron and his sister.

Negron grew up in the Bronx, where he sang in local doo-wop groups and played basketball both in schoolyard pick-up games and at William Howard Taft High School. He was recruited to play basketball at Allan Hancock College, a small community college in Santa Maria, California and played later at California State University, Los Angeles.

Career 

In 1967, singer Danny Hutton invited Negron to join him and Cory Wells to found the band Three Dog Night. The group became one of the most successful bands of the late 1960s and early 1970s, selling approximately 60 million records and earning gold records for singles that featured Negron as lead singer, including "One," "Easy To Be Hard," "Joy to the World," "Old Fashioned Love Song" and "The Show Must Go On."

Negron developed a serious heroin addiction, which began in the early 1970s. In July 1975, the British music magazine NME reported that Negron had been arrested for cocaine possession in Kentucky. Three Dog Night disbanded in 1976.

After many attempts at rehabilitation, Negron overcame his addiction in September 1991 and embarked on a solo career, recording the albums:
Am I Still in Your Heart? (1995)
Joy to the World (1996), a Christmas CD
Long Road Back (1999)
Chuck Negron – Live in Concert (2001), a double CD set<ref>{{cite book|url=http://www.allmusic.com/album/chuck-negron-live-in-concert-mw0000016251|title=Chuck Negron – Live In Concert|date=2001|author=Negron, Chuck|publisher=Sin-Drome Records}}</ref> recorded at Southern Methodist University (Dallas) and released on Sindrome Records, with sidemen Richard Campbell on bass guitar; Danny Mishkit on guitar, keyboards and saxophone; Frank Reina on drums; and Terence Elliott on lead guitarLive and In Concert (2005)The Chuck Negron Story (2005)Negron Generations (2017)

Negron wrote his autobiography, Three Dog Nightmare (1999), in which he describes his life as a high school athlete and a member of a successful rock band. He writes about his descent into drug abuse and attributes his recovery from heroin addiction to his turning to God in desperation after dropping out from more than thirty drug treatment facilities. A revised edition with several new chapters was released in 2008 and an updated version was released in 2018.

 Personal life 
In 2006, Negron was featured in an episode of the A&E reality show Intervention'' about his son, Chuckie, and grandson, Noah.

Negron has been married four times. He was married to Paula Louise Ann Goetten from 1970–73 and they had a daughter, Shaunti Negron-Levick. In 1976, he married Julia Densmore, the former wife of The Doors drummer John Densmore. They were married for twelve years and had a son, Charles "Chuckie" Negron III (she has a son, Berry Duane Oakley Jr., from a previous relationship with Allman Brothers Band bassist Berry Oakley). In 1993, Negron married Robin Silna. They had a daughter, Charlotte Rose, and divorced in 2001. He married his manager, Ami Albea, on May 9, 2020. Due to the COVID-19 pandemic, the wedding took place on the balcony of their home, with his two youngest daughters and the minister on the street below.

Negron has a daughter, Annabelle Negron, with actress Kate Vernon.

Actor Taylor Negron was Negron's cousin.

References

Sources

External links 

Official website

1942 births
20th-century American singers
21st-century American singers
American male singer-songwriters
American rock singers
American rock songwriters
American people of British descent
American people of Puerto Rican descent
Allan Hancock Bulldogs men's basketball players
Living people
Singers from New York City
Three Dog Night members
20th-century American male singers
21st-century American male singers
Singer-songwriters from New York (state)